is the debut studio album and first major Japanese release of South Korean girl group Rainbow, It was released on March 28, 2012, in Japan under Universal Sigma. The album was released in two versions, a CD & DVD Edition and a regular CD Edition. It was preceded by the singles "A", "Mach" and first original Japanese single "Gonna Gonna Go!". The album was re-released on December 12, 2012, in three different editions.

Editions

Standard version
The album was released in two different editions: CD & DVD Edition and the Regular CD Edition.

The CD & DVD Edition contains the CD album and a DVD containing the "RAINBOW Premium Live at SHIBUYA PUBLIC HALL" show, including the songs "Mach", "Not Your Girl", "To Me", "Gossip Girl", and "A". It also includes a backstage video of the "Premium Live" show, and a special music video of "Mach", featuring more solo and group shots, also known as a "Close-Up" version from the original music video.

The Regular CD Edition of Over the Rainbow contains only the CD album itself.

Special version
Nine months later, on December 12, the album was re-released in three different editions: two CD+DVD editions and a 2CD only edition.

The CD+DVD editions include the Over The Rainbow album and a special DVD: Type A includes all music videos of the group included on the albums and Type B includes performances of all Korean promotional tracks at that time being, "Gossip Girl", "Not Your Girl", "A", "Mach", "To Me" and "Sweet Dream". All performances are from the KBS' show Music Bank.

The CD only edition include two CDs: the standard Over the Rainbow as CD 1 and a special Korean greatest hits on the CD 2, including tracks from the mini albums Gossip Girl and So Girls. This edition includes the Japanese song "Candy Girls!", theme song of the animated show Zoobles!, as bonus track of the CD 2.

Track listing

Charts

Oricon

Other charts

Release history

References 

2012 albums
J-pop albums
Japanese-language albums
Rainbow (girl group) albums
Universal Music Japan albums